"Lyin' King" is the first single released from Nine's second album, Cloud 9. It was released on July 23, 1996 and was produced by Rob Lewis. "Lyin' King" was Nine's final charting single, making it to three different Billboard charts, including 35 on the Hot Rap Singles. The song is an indirect diss aimed at rappers who were trying to capitalize on the popular Mafioso rap at the time.

Music video

The official music video for the song was directed by Michael Lucero.

Single track listing

A-Side
"Lyin' King" (Clean Version)
"Lyin' King" (Album Version)
"Lyin' King" (Catch The Beat Instrumental)

B-Side
"Industry Party"
"Industry Party" (Instrumental)
"Lyin' King" (Instrumental)
"Lyin' King" (Acapella)

Charts

References

1996 singles
Music videos directed by Michael Lucero
Nine (rapper) songs
Profile Records singles
1996 songs